The Ciopa is a left tributary of the river Bârzava in Romania. It flows into the Bârzava in Rovinița Mare.

References

Rivers of Romania
Rivers of Timiș County